Louis Armstrong Meets Oscar Peterson is a 1959 studio album (recorded in 1957) by Louis Armstrong, accompanied by Oscar Peterson.

The album was reissued in 1997 on CD with four bonus tracks, recorded at the sessions that produced Ella and Louis Again.

Track listing
 "That Old Feeling" (Lew Brown, Sammy Fain) – 2:42
 "Let's Fall in Love" (Harold Arlen, Ted Koehler) – 3:14
 "I'll Never Be the Same" (Matty Malneck, Frank Signorelli, Gus Kahn) – 3:29
 "Blues in the Night" (Arlen, Johnny Mercer) – 5:10
 "How Long Has This Been Going On?" (George Gershwin, Ira Gershwin) – 5:56
 "I Was Doing All Right" (G. Gershwin, I. Gershwin) – 3:20
 "What's New?" (Sonny Burke, Bob Haggart) – 2:40
 "Moon Song" (Sam Coslow, Arthur Johnston) – 4:31
 "Just One of Those Things" (Cole Porter) – 4:02
 "There's No You" (Tom Adair, Hal Hopper) – 2:14
 "You Go to My Head" (J. Fred Coots, Haven Gillespie) – 6:24
 "Sweet Lorraine" (Cliff Burwell, Mitchell Parish) – 5:11

Bonus tracks
"I Get a Kick out of You" (Porter) – 4:16
 "Makin' Whoopee" (Walter Donaldson, Kahn) – 3:55
 "Willow Weep for Me" (Ann Ronell) – 4:16
 "Let's Do It (Let's Fall in Love)" (Porter) – 8:42

Personnel

Performance
 Louis Armstrong – trumpet, vocals
 Oscar Peterson – piano
 Herb Ellis – guitar
 Ray Brown – double bass
 Louie Bellson – drums

Production
 Leonard Feather – liner notes
 Val Valentin 	– engineer
 Norman Granz – producer

References

1957 albums
Louis Armstrong albums
Oscar Peterson albums
Verve Records albums
Albums produced by Norman Granz
Collaborative albums

Albums recorded at Capitol Studios